Colegio Nuestra Señora is a Chilean high school located in Graneros, Cachapoal Province, Chile. It was Founded in 1884 by the Congregation of the Sisters of the Holy Union of the Sacred Hearts.

References 

Educational institutions with year of establishment missing
Secondary schools in Chile
Schools in Cachapoal Province